Moriwaki Engineering is a Japanese manufacturer of speciality high performance products and motorcycle accessories. 



Company founder

Mamoru Moriwaki is a Japanese motorcycle tuner, race team owner and founder of Moriwaki Engineering, a Japanese specialty engineering company that designs, manufactures and sells high performance parts for motorcycles and cars. 

His motorcycle industry career is closely intertwined with that of Pops Yoshimura, another respected motorcycle tuner. 

Moriwaki began his career as a motorcycle racer for Hideo "Pops" Yoshimura, a respected motorcycle mechanic and tuner involved in Japanese motorcycle racing. Moriwaki received no formal training in engineering while working for Yoshimura. Instead, he became self-taught, learning about mechanical engineering from books borrowed from his local high school. Moriwaki married Namiko Yoshimura, Pops’ eldest daughter, while he was working for the company. While working for the Yoshimura racing team, Moriwaki also successfully competed in auto racing, driving a Yoshimura-prepared Honda S800 sports car to a class victory at the 6 Hours of Fuji endurance race on July 26, 1970, and the GTS1 Class at the 1971 Japan Grand Prix.

In 1971, Yoshimura made the decision to move his company to the United States to take advantage of the burgeoning American motorcycle market. Moriwaki did not agree with Yoshimura and refused to leave his home in Japan. This created a rift between the two men; however, within a year Yoshimura had returned to Japan and sought Moriwaki for help after he had been cheated out of all his money in a business transaction in America. Moriwaki loaned Yoshimura money to re-establish himself. Yoshimura would go on to establish one of the premier manufacturers of motorcycle high performance parts in the United States and became closely associated with the Suzuki racing program.

Moriwaki remained in Japan and in 1973 he founded Moriwaki Engineering in Suzuka City, Japan. He became known for modifying engines and constructing frames for the Kawasaki Z1. His bikes were successfully raced in the Australian Superbike championships in the late 1970s by New Zealander Graeme Crosby. Crosby and co-rider Tony Hatton finished in third place at the prestigious Suzuka 8 Hours endurance race in 1978. Moriwaki's reputation continued to be enhanced when Crosby and Akitaka Tomie qualified a Moriwaki Kawasaki on pole position at the 1979 Suzuka 8 Hours, ahead of all the major factory racing teams. At the 1980 Suzuka 8 Hours race, the Moriwaki team of Dave Aldana and David Emde qualified in a respectable second place ahead of the official Kawasaki factory-backed team of Eddie Lawson and Gregg Hansford.

After Crosby went on to race in the world championships, Moriwaki hired Australian rider Wayne Gardner in 1981. Also in 1981, Moriwaki developed the world’s first aluminum frame for large capacity motorcycles and entered them in competitions. Gardner and John Pace qualified their Moriwaki Kawasaki on pole position at the 1981 Suzuka 8 Hours, once again beating all the major factory racing teams. Gardner then rode the Moriwaki Kawasaki to an impressive fourth place finish at the 1981 Daytona Superbike race behind Yoshimura Suzuki riders Crosby, Wes Cooley and Honda's Freddie Spencer. Moriwaki and Gardner proceeded to compete in the British championship, winning their first race in England. Gardner entered the final race of the season with a chance to win the title but, an engine misfire relegated him to third place overall in the championship. Gardner's impressive results on the Moriwaki Kawasaki eventually earned him a contract with the Honda factory racing team and an eventual world championship in 1987.

In the 1980s, Moriwaki became closely associated with Honda Racing Corporation, the racing division for the Honda parent company. Moriwaki was the first outside firm allowed to use one of Honda's racing engines. From 2003 to 2005, Moriwaki competed in the premier MotoGP class with a Honda RC211V engine in a Moriwaki designed frame. The firm gained valuable knowledge from this experience and in 2010, a Moriwaki-framed machine run by Gresini Racing took the inaugural Moto2 title with rider Toni Elias. On the MD600, Elias won 7 races with the bike and secured the championship with a fourth place at the Malaysian Grand Prix, held at Sepang.

The Moto2 formula is based on a universal engine and engine-ancillary equipment specification, with identical controlled engines supplied to teams via the organisers, previously based on the Honda CBR600RR superseded by the Triumph Street Triple RS 765 from the 2019 season. Fuel, oil brakes and tyres are also controlled. Teams are able to use any supplier of chassis, suspension and bodywork under strict regulations to enable no one team to dominate by technology or expenditure.

Midori Moriwaki and World Superbikes
In late 2018 at EICMA, it was announced that Moriwaki would join with Honda Racing Corporation to run the Honda Fireblade in World Superbikes during 2019 with riders Leon Camier and Ryuichi Kiyonari. Initially using Japanese Superbike race series specification as a base-setting, the team collaborates with Europe-based Althea Racing. Previously Honda's alliance was with Ten Kate Racing, but due to poor results Honda decided on  full-factory backing with long-term partner in Japan motorsport Moriwaki Racing.  Previously Midori Moriwaki was Team Manager for KYB Moriwaki Motul Racing in Endurance events.

Results
(key) (Races in bold indicate pole position; races in italics indicate fastest lap)

* Season still in progress.

References

External links
 Moriwaki Engineering

Japanese companies established in 1973
Automotive companies of Japan